Dr. Axel Berg (born 26 March 1959 in Stuttgart) is a German politician and member of the SPD.

Berg, MP for Munich-North, was the only directly elected member of the Bavarian SPD member in the Bundestag until his defeat at the 2009 German federal election. He was a member of the Bundestag from 1998 to 2009.

References

External links 
 Official website 
 Biography by German Bundestag 

1959 births
Living people
Politicians from Stuttgart
Ludwig Maximilian University of Munich alumni
University of Tübingen alumni
Goethe University Frankfurt alumni
Members of the Bundestag for Bavaria
Members of the Bundestag 2005–2009
Members of the Bundestag 2002–2005
Members of the Bundestag 1998–2002
Members of the Bundestag for the Social Democratic Party of Germany